Thomas Wilson was an Irish Anglican clergyman, Chancellor of the Diocese of Cashel from 1608 until 1615 and Archdeacon of Cashel from 1615 until 1616.

References 

17th-century Irish Anglican priests
Archdeacons of Cashel
Year of birth missing
Year of death missing
Alumni of Trinity College Dublin